Terror at Red Wolf Inn (also released as Terror House and Folks at Red Wolf Inn) is a 1972 American horror film directed by Bud Townsend, and starring Linda Gillen, John Neilson, and Arthur Space. The plot follows a young college student who wins a vacation to a rural resort run by an elderly couple who serve meals of human flesh. Though it contains prominent horror elements, critics and scholars have noted the film as being an early example of comedy horror due to its "tongue-in-cheek" humor.

Plot

Regina (Linda Gillen) is a lonely young college student. The rest of the students are leaving for spring break, but Regina has no money and no plans. As she is opening her mail, she notices she's received a mysterious letter telling her that she's won a free vacation at a seaside bed and breakfast called the Red Wolf Inn. When she calls the phone number in the letter, they tell her that a private plane is waiting for her at the airport, and that she'd better hurry. The plane takes her to a remote rural destination, where she is greeted by a handsome but odd young man who says his name is Baby John Smith (John Neilson). Baby John takes her on a thrill ride speeding through town and evading the police. When Regina enjoys the chase instead of being afraid, Baby John is impressed.

Arriving at the Inn, she is greeted by Henry Smith (Arthur Space) and Evelyn Smith (Mary Jackson), the elderly proprietors of the mansion. They identify themselves as Baby John's grandparents. There are two other guests as well, both lovely young females named Pamela (Janet Wood) and Edwina (Margaret Avery). Regina asks to use the phone so she can call her mother, but it's out of order. The group sits down to an extravagant meal, during which Evelyn prompts them all to eat more and more. That night, Regina goes to the kitchen to look for antacid. She is terrified when Baby John suddenly emerges from the walk-in refrigerator, brandishing a large knife. Her screaming wakes everyone else in the house, and Baby John apologizes for scaring her. Before going back to sleep, Edwina talks with Regina and says she can tell Regina and Baby John are attracted to one another, and Regina admits that it's true.

The next day, Edwina and Regina discover that Pamela has left, but Regina finds a carriage house behind the mansion where Pamela's stylish black dress is hanging. She also discovers a framed photo of the pilot who flew her to this isolated destination. Regina and Baby John share a moment on the beach, where they flirt in an almost childlike way, then kiss. But then Baby John reacts violently when he reels in a shark on his fishing line, grabbing the animal by the tail and bashing it against a piece of driftwood on the beach, screaming "Shark!!" over and over. After this bizarre display, he tells Regina "I think I love you," and leaves. That night, there is another party, this time to celebrate Edwina's 'last night', as she is going home the next day. After another huge dinner, the group goes to bed, but the Smiths go to Edwina's room and abduct her from her bed by knocking her unconscious with chemicals on a rag. They carry her into the refrigerator and close the door, and we hear the sounds of the Smiths dismembering her body.

The next day, Regina is alarmed when Evelyn tells her that Edwina left without saying goodbye. Regina finds the phone in order and calls her mother, but before she can tell her anything, Evelyn disconnects them.  A police car pulls up outside the mansion, and Regina bursts out of the house seeking help, but the cop is another grandson of the Smiths (played by producer Michael MacReady). Now realizing she is a prisoner, Regina is left in the charge of Baby John while the Smiths go into town, and she seizes the opportunity to explore the forbidden refrigerator, where she finds the decapitated heads of Edwina and Pamela. Regina screams in horror as she realizes the Smiths are cannibals and she's been eating human flesh for two days. Now realizing she will be next, a panicked Regina bolts from the house with Baby John pursuing, but she is caught by Evelyn and Henry returning from their errand.

Once they are back at the Inn, Regina and Baby John have a private moment where they say they love each other. Regina knows that Henry and Evelyn intend to kill her, but Baby John has a childlike attitude, and thinks they will learn to accept her. At dinner that night, Regina faces an unspoken challenge. The Smiths study her carefully to see if she will eat the meat now that she knows what it is, hence judging if she would actually be able to join their clan as a mate for Baby John. Regina is unable to eat and runs from the table in disgust, and the Smiths have made up their mind that Regina will be meat. Baby John is distressed, and begins hurling dishes around screaming "No!!"

After dinner, he goes upstairs to help Regina escape. They sneak out of the house and try and escape in the car, but Henry has removed the spark plugs. They release their dog on the couple, and it corners them in the greenhouse, attacking Regina. Baby John kills it with a shovel, and the Smiths arrive shortly after. Realizing the dog is dead, Evelyn uses it to distract Baby John by weeping over the corpse, while Henry advances on Regina with a large cleaver. Regina starts screaming in a panic, and blood splatters over a nearby plant. Out of focus, we see a body being dragged away from the scene.

The next scene, we see Baby John sitting at a table in the Inn's kitchen, playing with a toy truck while someone sings a song to him that Evelyn used to sing. We see it is Regina, however, making cookies for Baby John. The camera pans into the freezer to reveal the decapitated heads of Evelyn and Henry. The cycle of flesh eating at the Red Wolf Inn will continue, and apparently Regina is the new chef.

Cast
Linda Gillen as Regina McKee 
John Neilson as Baby John Smith 
Arthur Space as Henry Smith
Mary Jackson as Evelyn Smith
Janet Wood as Pamela
Margaret Avery as Edwina 
Michael Macready as Jonathan the Deputy
Earl Parker as Paul the Pilot

Critical reception
TV Guide awarded the film one out of four stars, but added that it is a "gruesome parody...Creepy and witty in all the right spots, [Terror at Red Wolf Inn] is no masterwork, but it does have some merit as part of the subgenre of family horror." Film critic James Arena wrote of the film: "Packed tighter than a sardine can with cannibalism innuendos, some of this movie's dialogue [feels] a wee bit redundant. The most disturbing thing about it [is] watching the innkeepers' deplorable table manners at meal time."

Leonard Maltin awarded the film one-and-a-half stars out of four, writing that it "Predates other cannibalism efforts, and doesn't take itself that seriously." Roger Ebert chose it as one of his Dogs of the Week on "Sneak Previews"; the movie that Ebert saw was released under the title "Terror House".

Influence
The film has been noted by film scholars such as John Kenneth Muir as an early example of horror-comedy with its "light, almost tongue-in-cheek approach to the gruesome material." The narrative set-up in which the protagonist is tricked into winning a fake vacation was an influence on I Still Know What You Did Last Summer (1998).

References

Works cited

External links

1972 films
Films directed by Bud Townsend
American slasher films
1972 horror films
1970s slasher films
American comedy horror films
Films about cannibalism
Films set in hotels
Films shot in California
1970s English-language films
1970s American films